Urbaniak is a Polish surname. Notable people with the surname include:

 Dorota Urbaniak (born 1972), Polish Canadian rower
 Hilde Urbaniak, German canoer
 James Urbaniak (born 1963), American actor
 Jarosław Urbaniak (born 1966), Polish politician
 Lena Urbaniak (born 1992), German athlete
 Michał Urbaniak (born 1943), Polish musician
 Mika Urbaniak (born 1980), Polish singer, daughter of Michał
 Urszula Urbaniak (born 1962), Polish director

Polish-language surnames